Mary Clyde (born February 19, 1953 in Provo, Utah) is an American short story writer, author of Survival Rates (W.W. Norton, 2001), which won the 1999 Flannery O'Connor Award for Short Fiction from the University of Georgia Press. Clyde was praised for her work by The New York Times: "Clyde's writing has many strengths, but the greatest one is her ability to transform a shallow experience into something resembling hope. That she does so with intelligence and wit makes this collection as good as they get." She graduated from Brigham Young University, University of Utah, with an M.A., in 1977, and Vermont College, with an M.F.A., in 1997. She is the mother of five children: Emily Clyde Curtis, Sarah, Rachel June Jones, David, and Thomas.

Published works
Short Story Collections
 

Anthology Publications

References

Sources
 Contemporary Authors Online, Gale, 2009. Farmington Hills, Mich.: Gale, 2009

American short story writers
Brigham Young University alumni
University of Utah alumni
Vermont College of Fine Arts alumni
1953 births
Living people
Writers from Provo, Utah